Kimberly (also Kimberley or Kimmberly) is a male and female given name of Old English origin. John Wodehouse, 1st Earl of Kimberley, a place in Norfolk, England, popularised the name by giving it to a town in South Africa and a region in Australia. The first element, Kimber, reflects various Old English personal names; in the case of the Earldom in Norfolk this first appeared as Chineburlai in 1086 and seems to mean "clearing of a woman called Cyneburg (Cyneburga in Latin)". The second element is the Old English leah or leigh "meadow, clearing in a woodland".

Origin of the given name
The given name Kimberley is derived from place of Kimberley, in Northern Cape, South Africa. This South African place name was named after  Lord Kimberley in the 19th century.  At the end of the 19th century, this place was the scene of fighting and a British victory during the Second Boer War, and consequently the given name was popularised in the English-speaking world.

The name of Lord Kimberley's title is derived from Kimberley, in Norfolk, England. This place name is derived from two Old English elements: the first is the feminine personal name Cyneburg, which means "royal fortress"; the second element is lēah, which means "woodland" or "clearing". The place name roughly means: the "woodland clearing of the royal fortress." This place name was recorded in the Domesday Book of 1086 as Chineburlai.

Variants
Kimberly is a given name with many variants. Kimberley is used for males and females, while Kimberlee, Kimberleigh, and Kimberli are common feminine variant forms.

The common Korean surname Kim is not related to Kimberley.

Notable people
 Kimberly Anyadike (born 1994), Nigerian-American aviator
 Kimberly Brooks (born 1968), American voice actress
 Kimberly Brooks (artist), American artist and author
 Kimberley Chen (born 1994), Australian-born, Taiwanese singer of Malaysian descent
 Kimberly B. Cheney (born 1935), American lawyer
 Kim Chiu (born 1990), Filipino actress, singer
 Kimberley Cooper (born 1980), Australian actress
 Kimberly Davis (born 1974), American professional wrestler known by her ring name "Amber O'Neal"
 Kim Deal (born 1961), American musician
 Kimberly Elise (born 1967), American actress
 Kimberly Goss (born 1978), American singer of Korean descent
 Kim Guadagno (born 1959), New Jersey politician
 Kimberly Guilfoyle (born 1969), American news reporter
 Kimberly Hampton (1976-2004), United States Army officer
 Kimberly Hart-Simpson (born 1987), Welsh actress and businesswoman
 Kim Hughes (born 1954), Australian cricketer
 Kimberly Jones, American author
 Kimberly "Kim" Kardashian (born 1980), American entertainer
 Kimberly Keeton, American computer scientist
 Kim Matula (born 1988), American actress
 Kimberly Poore Moser (born 1962), American politician from Kentucky
 Kimberley Nixon (born 1986), Welsh actress
 Kimberly A. Novick, American environmental scientist
 Kymberly Pine (born 1970), State of Hawaii House of Representatives
 Kimberly Powers, American epidemiologist
 Kimberley Rew (born 1951), British guitarist and singer in Katrina and the Waves
 Kimberly “Kim” Rhode (born 1979), American double trap and skeet shooter
 Kim Shattuck (1963-2019), American musician
 Kim Taylor (born 1978), American politician from Virginia
 Kimberly Tuck (born 1974), Canadian curler
 Kimberley Walsh (born 1981), English singer in the girl band Girls Aloud
 Kimberly Williams-Paisley (born 1971), American actress
 Kimberley Anne Woltemas (born 1992), Thai actress and model
 Kimberly Wyatt (born 1982), member of The Pussycat Dolls
 Kim Zolciak-Biermann (born 1978), American singer and reality star from The Real Housewives of Atlanta
 Kitty Brucknell (born Kimberley Dayle Edwards, 1984), English singer-songwriter
 Kym Marsh (born 1976), English actress
 Lil' Kim (born Kimberley Denise Jones, 1974), singer

Fictional characters
 Kim Possible, a character in the television series of the same name
 Kimberly Andrews on the television series One Life to Live
 Kimberly "Kim" Bauer, a character in the television series 24
 Kimberly "Kim" Burgess, a character in the television series Chicago P.D.
 Kimberly Corman, a character in the film Final Destination 2
 Kimberly Hart, a character in the Power Rangers franchise
 Kimberly "Kim" Hyde, a character in the television series Home and Away
 Kimberly "Kim" Pine, a character in the series of graphic stories Scott Pilgrim
 Kimberly Cougar "Kimmy" Schmidt, a character in the television series Unbreakable Kimmy Schmidt
 Kimberly Shaw in the television series Melrose Place
 Kimberly Swan (commonly referred to as Ki Swan), a character in the web television series Video Game High School
 Kimberly "Kim" Wexler, a character in the television series Better Call Saul

See also
 Kim (given name)
 Kimmie

References

Given names
Feminine given names
English feminine given names
English-language feminine given names
English-language unisex given names